Salvatore Mangione, known as Salvo (22 May 1947 – 12 September 2015), was an Italian artist who lived and worked in Turin.

References

External links
 Archivio Salvo

20th-century Italian painters
Italian male painters
2015 deaths
1947 births
Artists from Turin
Italian contemporary artists
20th-century Italian male artists